Ratfor (short for Rational Fortran) is a programming language implemented as a preprocessor for Fortran 66. It provides modern control structures, unavailable in Fortran 66, to replace GOTOs and statement numbers.

Features 
Ratfor provides the following kinds of flow-control statements, described by Kernighan and Plauger as "shamelessly stolen from the language C, developed for the UNIX operating system by D.M. Ritchie" ("Software Tools", p. 318):

 statement grouping with braces
 if-else, while, for, do, repeat-until, break, next
 "free-form" statements, i.e., not constrained by Fortran format rules
 <, >, >=, ... in place of .LT., .GT., .GE., ...
 include
 # comments

For example, the following code
if (a > b) {
  max = a
} else {
  max = b
}
might be translated as
      IF(.NOT.(A.GT.B))GOTO 1
      MAX = A
      GOTO 2
    1 CONTINUE
      MAX = B
    2 CONTINUE
The version of Ratfor in Software Tools is written in Ratfor, as are the sample programs, and inasmuch as its own translation to Fortran is available, it can be ported to any Fortran system. Ratfor source code file names end in .r or .rat.

History 
Ratfor was designed and implemented by Brian Kernighan at Bell Telephone Laboratories in 1974, and described in Software—Practice & Experience in 1975.  It was used in the book "Software Tools" (Kernighan and Plauger, 1976).

In 1977, at Purdue University, an improved version of the Ratfor preprocessor was written. It was called Mouse4, as it was smaller and faster than Ratfor. A published document by Dr. Douglas Comer, professor at Purdue, concluded "contrary to the evidence exhibited by the designer of Ratfor, sequential search is often inadequate for production software. Furthermore, in the case of lexical analysis, well-known techniques do seem to offer efficiency while retaining the simplicity, ease of coding and modularity of ad hoc methods." (CSD-TR236).

In comparison to the Ratfor preprocessor on a program of 3000 source lines running on a CDC 6500 system took 185.470 CPU seconds. That was cut by 50% when binary search was used in the Ratfor code. Rewriting the ad hoc lexical scanner using a standard method based on finite automata reduced run time to 12.723 seconds.

With the availability of Fortran 77, a successor named Ratfiv (Ratfor=rat4 => rat5=Ratfiv) could, with an option /f77, output a more readable Fortran 77 code:
      IF (A .GT. B) THEN
        MAX = A
      ELSE
        MAX = B
      ENDIF

Initial Ratfor source code was ported to C in 1985  and improved to produce Fortran 77 code too. A git tree has been set in 2010 in order to revive ratfor
.
Although the GNU C compiler had the ability to directly compile a Ratfor file (.r) without keeping a useless intermediate Fortran code (.f) (gcc foo.r), this functionality was lost in version 4 during the move in 2005 from f77 to GNU Fortran.

Source packages, .deb or src.rpm package are still available for users who needs to compile old Ratfor software on any operating system.

Ratfiv 
Ratfiv is an enhanced version of the Ratfor programming language, a preprocessor for Fortran designed to give it C-like capabilities. Fortran was widely used for scientific programming but had very basic control-flow primitives ("do" and "goto") and no "macro" facility which limited its expressiveness.

The name of the language is a pun (Ratfor (RATional FORtran) -> "Rat Four" -> "Rat Five" -> RatFiv).

Ratfiv was developed by Bill Wood at the Institute for Cancer Research, Philadelphia, PA in the early 1980s and released on several DECUS (Digital Equipment Users Group) SIG (Special Interest Group) tapes.  It is based on the original Ratfor by B. Kernighan and P. J. Plauger, with rewrites and enhancements by David Hanson and friends (U. of Arizona), Joe Sventek and Debbie Scherrer (Lawrence Berkeley National Laboratory).

Ratfiv V2.1 was distributed on the DECUS RSX82a SIG tape.

See also 
 Fortran
 EFL

References

External links 
 Ratfor
 Ratfor90
 History of Programming Languages: Ratfor
 Purdue summary
 Ratfor90

Fortran programming language family
Programming languages created in 1976